John Edward Butler (1836-?) was an American politician, lawyer, and newspaper editor from Maine. Butler, a Republican from Biddeford, Maine, served two single year terms in the Maine Senate (1873–74). Butler, a Free Will Baptist, was born in Berwick, Maine and attended Bowdoin College without graduating. He was a delegate to the 1872 Republican National Convention and editor of the Biddeford Union and Journal newspaper.

References

1836 births
Year of death missing
People from Berwick, Maine
Politicians from Biddeford, Maine
Presidents of the Maine Senate
Republican Party Maine state senators
Maine lawyers
19th-century American newspaper publishers (people)
Bowdoin College alumni